Aliona Munteanu (born 25 May 1989), better known as Aliona Moon, is a Moldovan singer. In 2012, she was a backing vocalist for Pasha Parfeny who represented Moldova at the Eurovision Song Contest 2012.  Aliona was selected to represent her country in the Eurovision Song Contest 2013 in Malmö with the song "O Mie" composed by Pasha Parfeny. Aliona finished in fourth place in the first semi-final and 11th place in the Eurovision 2013 final. In 2014, she competed on The Voice of Romania where she finished in fourth place in the final.

Biography 

Ethnic Moldavian songs and lullabies sung by her mother developed Aliona's interest for music. Since her childhood Aliona was a member of several artistic collectives, where she performed both music and dances. Later she was involved in the talent show Fabrica de Staruri 2 (Star Factory) where she gained the third place and the title of the public's favourite.

With two of her ex-colleagues from Star Factory, Aliona formed the pop band Thumbs Up. The band existed for two years until the break-up in 2011. After that, Aliona took some trophies at international musical festivals as a solo artist, most notably at the Martisor Dorohoian and Dan Spătaru festivals, which were held in Romania.

In 2012 she participated on Eurovision in Baku, as a back-vocalist for Pasha Parfeny's song, which reached 11th place. Pasha returned to Eurovision in 2013, this time as a composer and record producer, and also backed Aliona on the piano, as he did at the national selection final. Despite being performed in English as "A Million" in the preselection, the Romanian version of the song, "O mie" (A thousand) was performed in the contest.

References

Eurovision Song Contest entrants of 2013
Living people
1989 births
Articles containing video clips
Eurovision Song Contest entrants for Moldova
21st-century Moldovan women singers
Musicians from Chișinău